Hampshire and Isle of Wight Wildlife Trust is a Wildlife Trust with 27,000 members across the counties of Hampshire and the Isle of Wight, England.

The trust describes itself as the leading local wildlife conservation charity in Hampshire and the Island with the stated aim of improving conditions for wildlife on land and at sea. The organisation also runs community engagement events helping local people find out about their local wild places.

Nature reserves

The trust currently manages 46 wildlife reserves, including woodland, meadow, heathland, and coastal habitats. The Trust also runs four education centres at its Blashford Lakes, Testwood Lakes, Swanwick Lakes and Bouldnor Forest reserves, where education activities for young people and adults take place.

Work with other organisations

The trust's projects include: advice to landowners on how to manage their land with wildlife in mind, including commoners in the New Forest; species reintroductions like working with the South Downs National Park Authority to reintroduce water voles to the River Meon; and working with local authorities to make public spaces more wildlife-friendly.

Key

Public access
FP = public access to footpaths through the site
PL = public access at limited times
PP = Public access to part of the site
Yes = public access to the whole or most of the site

Other classifications
GCR = Geological Conservation Review
LNR = Local nature reserve
NCR = Nature Conservation Review
NNR = National nature reserve
Ramsar = Ramsar site, an internationally important wetland site
SAC = Special Area of Conservation
SPA = Special Protection Area under the European Union Directive on the Conservation of Wild Birds
SSSI = Site of Special Scientific Interest

See also

List of local nature reserves in Hampshire
List of Sites of Special Scientific Interest in Hampshire

Notes

References

Sources

 
Organisations based on the Isle of Wight
Organisations based in Hampshire